Podstepnoye is a rural locality (a selo) and the administrative center of Podstepnovsky Selsoviet, Rebrikhinsky District, Altai Krai, Russia. The population was 919 as of 2013. There are 19 streets.

Geography 
Podstepnoye is located 23 km southwest of Rebrikha (the district's administrative centre) by road. Panovo is the nearest rural locality.

References 

Rural localities in Rebrikhinsky District